The women's heptathlon event at the 2002 World Junior Championships in Athletics was held in Kingston, Jamaica, at National Stadium on 19 and 20 July.

Medalists

Results

Final
19/20 July

Participation
According to an unofficial count, 16 athletes from 11 countries participated in the event.

References

Heptathlon
Combined events at the World Athletics U20 Championships